Mediaset Italia Due, commonly known as Italia 2 (pronounced Italia Due ), is an Italian television channel, operated by Mediaset and owned by MFE - MediaForEurope. It was founded, and started to broadcast, in 2011.

Italia 2 currently broadcasts in Italian. It broadcasts at a national level and also serves to target Italian youth, aimed primarily at a male audience.

History
On July 1, 2011, Italia 2 started broadcasting its launch spots. On July 4, at 10pm CEST, it officially began broadcasting, with the first viewing of the film Dragonball Evolution.

The peculiarity of the schedule of Italia 2 for the first year consisted in its division into "zones", where each of them has a thematic character; amongst these, worthy of note is the U-Zone, made by the channel's viewers through their amateur videos. The daytime programming of Sunday and Saturday is different from the other days of the week. The first night programs started at 10 pm, then at 9:30 pm, and finally at 9:10 pm, like all Mediaset channels, with TV series and television programs divided into theme evenings.

In 2012, Italia 2 started transmitting different matches of the UEFA Europa League–until 2013, in partial simulcast with Italia 1 and Italia 1 HD free practice, qualifying and all of the Grand Prix of the world Championship and, from 2013 to 2018, free trials, qualifications and races of the world championships in Superbike, Superstock, Superstock 300 and the European Superstock 1000.

As of September 2012, the schedule has been enhanced with the daily broadcast of the second edition of Sport Mediaset. In 2013, the historical program Superclassifica Show made a return on Italia 2, renamed Superclassifica 2.

On September 2, 2012, the channel was to be restyled, which should have been called Italia .2, but in fact, it never materialized despite Mediaset announcing it with some promos broadcast during the summer of 2012.

On 19 April 2018, Italia 2 was replaced by a relaunch of Focus on its original frequencies on channel 35. Italia 2 was transferred to channel 120 on mux La3. On 28 February 2019, the channel took the channel 66, bought to Retecapri.

, Italia 2 is also available to be viewed on the Sky Italia platform at channel number 175.

Format
In the strategies of Mediaset, Italia 2 goes alongside La5, a channel aimed instead at a female audience. The schedule of the channel reflects this logic: it is composed of television series, films, cartoons, anime (some first-run), music, and sporting events, in addition to the revival of some of the TV programs of Italia 1, to which the network is affiliated. There are also some occasional internal productions.

Digital terrestrial frequencies
The spread of the channel began on digital terrestrial and originally on LCN 35 and, after a few weeks, also on the satellite platform Tivùsat, on Hotbird, frequency 11.013 MHz (later on 11.919 MHz, the historical frequency for Mediaset, where there is still).

, the channel is visible on LCNs 66 and 566.

Directors

Audience share
The goal of the channel is to reach a 0.4% share on the total individuals and 0.55% on the commercial target.

The maximum peak ratings achieved by the channel took place on October 14, 2012, during the Red Bull Stratos (which had an average audience of 867,000 viewers) with a share of 4.90% of the target individuals and 15.20% of the target men aged 15–34 years, with peaks of 1,856,000 viewers and the 19.4% share for the targeted audience.

Programming

Current
Programming on Italia 2 currently includes the following:

News
TGcom24
Meteo.it
Ciak News Speciale

TV Series (only premiere)

Community (TV series) (seasons 5-6)
Gotham (TV series) (season 3)
Grimm (TV series) (seasons 1-4)
Justified (TV series) (seasons 2-6)
Merlin (2008 TV series) (season 5)
Orphan Black (seasons 1-2)
The Big Bang Theory (episodes 88-102)
The Middle (TV series) (seasons 1-2 / 5-6)
The Office (American TV series) (seasons 1-4)
Shameless (American TV series) (season 4 - 10 and 11 coming soon)
2 Broke Girls (season 6)

Anime and cartoons (only premiere) 

 American Dad! (seasons 6-10)
 Case Closed (episodes 523-542)
 Kimagure Orange Road (full version and remastered)
Family Guy (seasons 8-12)
 Fire Force (coming soon)
 Future GPX Cyber Formula Saga (episodes 1-14)
 Gaiking: Legend of Daiku-Maryu (free-to-air transmission)
 Lupin the Third: The Woman Called Fujiko Mine
 MÄR (free-to-air transmission)
 My Hero Academia (from season 1 / OAV 4)
 Naruto: Shippuden (since episode 287)
 One Piece (since episode 453)
 The Cleveland Show (seasons 1-2)
 Saint Seiya: The Hades Chapter - Inferno (episodes 26-31) 
 Saint Seiya: The Lost Canvas (free-to-air transmission)
 Slayers Revolution (free-to-air transmission)
 Slayers Evolution-R (free-to-air transmission)

In past, Italy 2 has broadcast some important sporting events: the Formula E races, the FIFAe Nations Cup and the boxing matches of the Championship One. Also, there was made internal productions, referred to the network target.

Announcers
From 2011 to 2013 the official voice of the promotions of Italia 2 was by the dubber Paolo de Santis, while from 2014 it was by Gianluca Iacono. For short periods, they also dubbed the promo with Simone d'Andrea in 2015 and Luca Bottale in 2017.

References

Notes

Citations

External links
Official website

Mediaset television channels
Television channels and stations established in 2011
2011 establishments in Italy
Italian-language television stations